Edward Stourton, 13th Baron Stourton (1665–1720) was the eldest son of William Stourton.

He succeeded his father in 1685. Since the thirteenth Baron had no children, he was succeeded by his younger brother Thomas in 1720.

References
 Kidd, Charles and David Williamson (editors). Debrett's Peerage and Baronetage (1995 edition). London: St. Martin's Press, 1995.

1720 deaths
13
1665 births
17th-century English nobility
18th-century English people